A cruffin (sometimes spelled croffin) is a hybrid of a croissant and a muffin. The pastry is made by proofing (also called proving) and baking laminated dough in a muffin mould. The cruffin is then filled with a variety of creams, jams, crème pâtissières or curds, and then garnished.

The first known Cruffin to be created was by Kate Reid of Lune Croissanterie in Melbourne, Australia in 2013. The Cruffin was later popularized and trademarked by Mr. Holmes Bakehouse, from San Francisco. Since then, there have been multiple variations of the cruffin found all over the world.

History
Cruffins were sold at the Pacific National Exhibition in Vancouver BC, Canada, in late August 1984, from a towable "Cruffin"-like trailer. Cruffins can be savory or sweet.

The cruffin was originally created by Lune Croissanterie for Everyday Coffee, Melbourne, in July 2013.

United States
The cruffin was popularised in San Francisco by Australian pastry chef Ry Stephen and co-owner Aaron Caddel of Mr. Holmes Bakehouse in November 2014.

In March 2015, Stephen claims the store was broken into and the recipe binders that hold the recipe for cruffins, and 230 other recipes, were stolen. Other things such as money, baking equipment, an iPad, computers were left untouched, and no one was ever charged.

See also

 Cronut – a croissant/doughnut pastry invented by Chef Dominique Ansel in 2013
 List of pastries

References

Pastries
Australian cuisine
Food and drink in the San Francisco Bay Area
Food and drink introduced in 2013